"Home" is the second episode of the fourth season of the American science fiction television series The X-Files, which originally aired on the Fox network on October11, 1996. Directed by Kim Manners, it was written by Glen Morgan and James Wong. "Home" is a "Monster-of-the-Week" story, unconnected to the overarching mythology of The X-Files. Watched by 18.85 million viewers, the initial broadcast had a Nielsen rating of 11.9. "Home" was the only episode of The X-Files to carry a TV-MA rating upon broadcast and the first to receive a viewer discretion warning for graphic content if the system had been present at the time; the TV Parental Guidelines rating system would be introduced two months later, on December 19, 1996.  Critics were generally complimentary, and praised the disturbing nature of the plot; several made comparisons to the work of director Tobe Hooper. Some reviewers felt the violence was excessive.

The series centers on FBI special agents Fox Mulder (David Duchovny) and Dana Scully (Gillian Anderson), who work on cases linked to the paranormal, collectively called "X-Files". Mulder is a believer in the paranormal; the skeptical Scully was initially assigned to debunk his work, but the two have developed a deep friendship. In this episode, Mulder and Scully investigate the death of a baby born with severe physical defects. Traveling to the small isolated town of Home, Pennsylvania, the pair meet the Peacocks, a family of deformed farmers who have not left their house in a decade. Initially, Mulder suspects the brothers kidnapped and raped a woman to father the child, but the investigation uncovers a long history of incest involving the Peacocks' own mother.

"Home" marks the return of writers Morgan and Wong, who left the show following its second season. They attempted to make the episode as ambitious and shocking as possible and were inspired by real-life events, including the documentary Brother's Keeper and a story from Charlie Chaplin's autobiography about an encounter with a family in rural Wales. The graphic content of the script attracted controversy from early in the production process. Commentators have identified themes within the episode that satirize the American Dream, address globalization, and explore the nature of motherhood. It has been cited as a seminal episode of The X-Files by critics and crew members.

Plot
In the small town of Home, Pennsylvania, a woman gives birth to a deformed baby. Three similarly-deformed men bury it near their dilapidated house during a rainstorm. Fox Mulder (David Duchovny) and Dana Scully (Gillian Anderson) are sent to investigate after the corpse is found by children during a sandlot-ball game. While talking to Home's sheriff Andy Taylor (Tucker Smallwood), Mulder asks whether the Peacock brothers—the inhabitants of the house nearest to the crime scene—have been questioned about the baby. Taylor informs him that the house dates to the American Civil War and is without electricity, running water, or heat. He also insinuates that the family has been inbreeding since the war. The three Peacock brothers watch the agents from their front porch.

During an autopsy, the agents discover that the baby suffocated by inhaling dirt—meaning that it was buried alive. Scully suggests that the baby's defects could have been caused by inbreeding. Mulder insists that this would be impossible since the Peacocks seem to live in an all-male household. Suspecting that the Peacocks have kidnapped and raped a woman, Mulder and Scully investigate their now-abandoned residence and discover blood, scissors, and a shovel on a table. In retaliation, the Peacocks enter Sheriff Taylor's house during the night and murder him and his wife, Barbara (Judith Maxie).

Laboratory tests indicate that the baby's parents were members of the Peacock family. Believing that the three Peacock brothers must be holding the dead baby's mother hostage, the agents and Deputy Barney Paster (Sebastian Spence) go to arrest them. When Paster breaks down the front door of the house, he is decapitated by a booby-trap, before the brothers rip the body apart. Mulder and Scully then release the Peacocks' pigs to lure them out of the house before searching it. The agents find a quadruple amputee hidden under a bed. She is revealed to be Mrs. Peacock, the mother of the boys. She was presumed dead from a car accident several years ago; however, she survived and continued to have inbred children. She reveals that she nor anyone in the family can feel pain. The brothers realize that Mulder and Scully are inside their house and attack. The two youngest sons withstand several gunshots before dying, one of them impaled on another booby-trap. Afterwards, the agents discover that Mrs. Peacock and her eldest son have escaped in their car, planning to start a new family elsewhere.

Production

Background

"Home" marked the return of writers Glen Morgan and James Wong, who had left production of The X-Files after the second season to work on other television projects. Before their departure, Morgan and Wong had written many episodes of the series and were instrumental in the success of its first season. The two developed Space: Above and Beyond, a science fiction television series canceled after one season. Subsequently, the two rejoined the staff of The X-Files and became writers for the fourth season. To make an impact for their return, they decided to write an ambitious story and attempted to produce a script shocking enough to push the boundaries of television. Space: Above and Beyond co-star Kristen Cloke advised them to study books about the "dark" side of nature so they could write about subjects like survivalism.

Many actors from Space: Above and Beyond appeared in the fourth season; the first was Tucker Smallwood, who portrays Sheriff Andy Taylor in "Home". When Morgan first pitched the episode to Chris Carter, he specifically described three actors from the show—James Morrison, Rodney Rowland and Morgan Weisser—as the trio of "big freak brothers". The episode contained references to popular television, such as the use of the names Andy Taylor and Barney, and referring to Mayberry, which are references to characters and fictional town from The Andy Griffith Show.

Writing

Sources consulted by the writers included Brother's Keeper (1992), a documentary film depicting the story of the Wards, four "barely literate" brothers who lived on a farm that had been passed on through their family for generations. The brothers drew international attention following the alleged murder of William Ward by his brother Delbert. With an estimated IQ of 68, Delbert escaped prosecution by claiming that the police had tricked him during interrogation. Wong chose to base the Peacock family on the Wards, incorporating their lifestyles into the script. The name "Peacock" came from the former neighbors of Morgan's parents.

Further inspiration came from a story in Charlie Chaplin's autobiography; while touring with a musical theatre production, he stayed at a miner's tenement home in Wales. After dinner, the host introduced Chaplin to a disfigured and legless man named Gilbert who slept in a kitchen cupboard; Glen Morgan incorrectly recalled this as a totally limbless boy who was kept under a bed. Chaplin described the man as "a half man with no legs, an oversize blond flat-shaped head, a sickening white face, a sunken nose, [and] a large mouth" who could jump using his arms, but this was misremembered by Morgan as though the man had no limbs and "flopp[ed] around" while the family sang and danced. Morgan used his memory of this incident within the screenplay, although at Wong's suggestion they changed the character to the boy's mother. The episode was also made as an homage to 1970s horror films such as Tobe Hooper's The Texas Chain Saw Massacre (1974) and Wes Craven's The Hills Have Eyes (1977).

It took some time for the concepts to come together into a story; elements first appeared in the second season episode "Humbug", written by Morgan's brother Darin and featuring a cast of circus sideshow performers. The episode incorporated several themes that had an influence on "Home", including the use of a "benign soul trapped in the body of a monster".

When director Kim Manners read the script for "Home", he called it "as classic a horror script [as] I'm ever going to see." The producers, on the other hand, felt the show had gone too far, and called it "tasteless". William B. Davis, the actor who portrayed the series' main antagonist The Smoking Man, argued that the screenplay read like Morgan and Wong deliberately wanted to go back to the stylistic origins of the series.

Filming and post-production

Like the rest of the fourth season, "Home" was filmed in British Columbia. Most of the scenes depicting buildings were shot in the town of Surrey, British Columbia. As the town's architecture comprised both old and new styles, careful reverse angles were employed to preserve the impression of "small-town America". The building used as the Peacock house had been previously utilized in the season two episode "Aubrey". At that time, the producers noted that the house had been "untouched for years" and was "so good" they had to return to film it again. The car that the Peacock family drives in the episode was found on a farm outside Vancouver. It was rented and restored for use in the episode. Cadillac later sent the producers a letter thanking them for including one of their cars in the show.

After the episode aired, Tucker Smallwood recalled that the filming was an unpleasant experience. He entered production of the episode with little knowledge of the nature of The X-Files, and was surprised when he received the screenplay. During his first day on set, he asked other cast members if the series was always so violent. An unidentified crew member said, "this is awful even for us", and commented that it was probably the most gruesome episode of the series run. During the sheriff's death scene Smallwood insisted on performing his own stunts, until he hit his head attempting a dive. Another uncomfortable moment for the actor involved lying face down in a pool of fake blood for more than 90 minutes.

The episode incorporates the song "Wonderful! Wonderful!" by musician Johnny Mathis. Having read the screenplay Mathis refused to allow his version to be used, owing to the episode's graphic content, and a cover version had to be created. Producer David Nutter, who had a background as a singer, intended to record the vocals but at the last minute another singer who sounded more like Mathis was hired. Manners explained that he wanted to use the song because "certain songs [like 'Wonderful! Wonderful!'] have a creepy, icky quality that none of us have really openly acknowledged".

"Home" was first submitted to the censors featuring audio of the baby screaming while being buried alive. Fox executives asked Ten Thirteen Productions to alter the audio so that the baby would sound sick; they noted that the audio change was needed to show the child was diseased and that the Peacocks were not simply killing an innocent child. Manners called the shot, shown from the child's perspective, of the baby's burial as "the most awful shot of my career". He said that he approached filming as seriously as he could because he felt the script was a classic. When production was finished, Manners declared that it was one of his favorites. Duchovny agreed with Manners, saying, "I really like that one. Although it didn't scare me." He explained that it "touched" him with its themes concerning the desire to "live and to propagate."

Themes

"Home" presents a satirical view of traditional family values, showcasing the conflict between classic American values and more modern culture. It contains parallels to Sam Shepard's play Buried Child, which ends with a child's corpse (who himself was the product of incest) being exhumed from the cornfield in the backyard. Writer Sarah Stegall viewed the opening as a commentary on the ideology of the American Dream, using the death of a child to "speak to us of buried hopes and fears, and the dark secrets that can hold a family together." The town of Home encompasses the traditional values of the nuclear family—only for it to be victimized by the Peacock family—who represent the darker side of paradise. The town depicted in "Home" showcases the positive qualities of a world without globalization, but the Peacock family exhibit the negative aspects. The episode's closing scene has been described as "quintessentially American", featuring the final Peacock brother driving away in a white  Cadillac with his mother "safely stowed in the trunk", ready to explore a brand new life.

The concept of motherhood is also explored in the episode. According to Elyce Rae Helford, in her book Fantasy Girls: Gender in the New Universe of Science Fiction and Fantasy Television, Mrs. Peacock functions as a being who has been reduced "to all female functions" by her sons. She is "the grotesquely willing mother who has lost any sense of individual purpose" other than to do anything for her children. Sonia Saraiya of The A.V. Club writes that "Scully's sympathy for a mother that she imagines to be persecuted is turned violently on its head, to reveal a monster whose priorities are not quite so straightforward." The episode is also one of the first to explore Scully's desire to become a mother. Grant Bain states that the episode presents the dual nature of Scully's "modern desire for motherhood", as opposed to Mrs. Peacock's "perverted notion of family". Helford writes that the entry predicts "Scully's fate as the mother of 'immaculately' (technologically) conceived and monstrous progeny". In the fifth season, Scully indeed learns that she is a mother, albeit accidentally, after her ova were harvested following her abduction in second season, and an alien/human hybrid named Emily is the result. With the revelation that Scully is pregnant at the end of the seventh season finale, "Requiem", the concept revolving around Scully as a mother took center stage in seasons eight and nine with the birth of baby William.

The use of the up-tempo "Wonderful! Wonderful!" during a violent murder sequence attracted attention for its contrasting presentation. Jan Delasara in X-Files Confidential called the murder of Sheriff Taylor and his wife the most "chilling moment in the series' run", highlighted by the use of a bouncy, classic pop song. It further establishes the episode's subversion of nostalgia, by using a well-known pop song during a death scene.

Broadcast and reception

Initial ratings and reception
"Home" originally aired on the Fox network on October 11, 1996. It had a Nielsen rating of 11.9, with a 21 share, meaning that roughly 11.9 percent of all television-equipped households, and 21 percent of households watching television, were tuned in to the episode. It was watched by 18.85 million viewers. "Home" was the only episode of The X-Files to carry a TV-MA rating upon broadcast and the first to receive a viewer discretion warning for graphic content if the system had been present at the time, with the opening scene being cited in particular due to its gruesomeness and its similarity to "stock horror film conventions". The only other instance of an episode of The X-Files earning a viewer discretion warning was in the season eight episode, "Via Negativa". Owing to that content, the network would not repeat the episode, the only time in the history of the series that this happened. In 1997, when the channel FX ran an all-day marathon of the most popular X-Files episodes, "Home" was the number one choice.

Upon its first broadcast, "Home" received several positive reviews from critics, although some were critical of its violence. Entertainment Weekly gave the episode an "A", describing it as "one of TV's most disturbing hours" and as "a cinematic feast for the eyes, packed with audacious wit". Sarah Stegall awarded the episode three stars out of five, comparing it positively to the more gruesome work of directors David Lynch and Tobe Hooper. Stegall praised the atmosphere and commented that Morgan and Wong's "long-awaited return" to the series was "definitely disturbing, thought-provoking, and nasty."

Among less favorable reviews, author Phil Farrand called "Home" his least-favorite episode of the first four seasons of the show in his book The Nitpicker's Guide to the X-Files, writing that he "just [did not] get this episode" because "Mulder and Scully seem reckless" and the Peacock brothers "are better suited for comic books". Paul Cornell, Keith Topping, and Martin Day, in their book X-Treme Possibilities, were critical of the violent content of the episode. Topping called the episode "sick", Cornell felt that Mulder and Scully's wisecracks made them come off as cruel, and Day felt that the violence went overboard. Day, however, offered a few complimentary observations, noting that "Home" did, indeed, have merit, and that the juxtaposition of "Wonderful! Wonderful!" with the violent antics of the Peacocks was something "David Lynch would be proud of".

Later reception

"Home" has continued to receive positive reviews. In a 2011 review, Emily VanDerWerff of The A.V. Club gave the episode an "A" rating and wrote that it would be difficult to write an episode like "Home" today, since small towns are no longer as isolated as they used to be, thanks to modern communications technology. She praised the depiction of urban sensibilities and the frightening Peacock family, observing that it represented a "sad farewell to a weird America that was rapidly smoothing itself out." Author Dean A. Kowalski, in The Philosophy of The X-Files, cited "Home", "Squeeze", and "The Host" as the most notable "monster-of-the-week" episodes.

"Home" has often been cited as one of the best X-Files episodes. Emily VanDerWerff of The A.V. Club placed it among the 10 best chapters of the series and called it one of the scariest hours of television she had seen. In 2009, The Vancouver Sun named "Home" one of the best stand-alone episodes of the series and wrote that, because of its horrific theme of incest, the episode "doesn't pull any punches". Den of Geek writer Nina Sordi placed the entry as the fourth best of the series in 2009, viewing its bleak humor and "thought-provoking moments" of dialogue as the factors that made it one of the most popular episodes. In 2008, Starpulse gave the installment an honorable mention as one of the 10 best X-Files episodes. In 2009, Connie Ogle from PopMatters rated the Peacock family among the greatest monsters of the series and stated that it was a miracle that the program "slipped past" the censors. Kat Hughes of The Companion wrote that "perhaps the most frightening thing of all about 'Home' though, is its ending. Here [the series] ventures into territory that many horror movies dare not – it doesn’t resolve the issue. There is no happy ending, the good guys didn’t win, and the bad guys are still out there, ready to – as Mrs. Peacock states – “begin again”."

Critics have also named "Home" one of the scariest installments of the series. Novelist Scott Heim in The Book of Lists: Horror rated it as the tenth most frightening television broadcast. Heim wrote that several aspects of the episode were creepy, including the gothic house and the family itself. Tom Kessenich, in his 2002 book Examination: An Unauthorized Look at Seasons 6–9 of the X-Files, listed the program as the fifth best of the series. Kessenich reported that it was the pinnacle of the horror episodes featured on The X-Files. William B. Davis said that "Home" was both well written and well directed, but was so gruesome that it led to some fans questioning whether or not they wanted to continue watching the series. He argued that modern horror films were far more violent than anything depicted in "Home" but, at the time, "it was quite disturbing." In 2017, Vulture.com named "Home" the most terrifying television episode to watch on Halloween.

Footnotes

Bibliography

External links

 

1996 American television episodes
Appalachia in fiction
Incest in television
Rating controversies in television
Television episodes set in Pennsylvania
Television episodes pulled from general rotation
The X-Files (season 4) episodes
Television controversies in the United States